The Great Valley is a west-to-east valley through the center of Chester County, Pennsylvania, United States.  It is also sometimes referred to as Chester Valley, and both names are in use throughout the region.  The valley stretches from the Schuylkill River in Montgomery County in the east, southwesterly through Chester and Lancaster counties.  The valley is most distinct in central Chester County, although traces of it can be followed almost the entire distance between the Delaware and Susquehanna rivers.

Valley Creek flows along the base of eastern Great Valley, towards the Schuylkill River.  A second creek, also named Valley Creek, flows westward from Frazer into the East Branch Brandywine Creek.  Beaver Creek flows eastward along the northern side of the valley from around Thorndale into the East Branch Brandywine Creek.  Multiple branches of both the Brandywine and Octoraro creeks cross the valley.

Communities
Significant communities in the Great Valley include, from east to west, King of Prussia, Valley Forge, Chesterbrook, Paoli, Malvern, Exton, Downingtown, Thorndale, Coatesville, Parkesburg, and Atglen.

Transportation
The Great Valley forms a natural route to the west from the Philadelphia area.  Both the Pennsylvania Turnpike and U.S. Route 202 follow the eastern portion of the valley.  U.S. Route 30 enters the valley around Malvern and serves as the main thoroughfare in the valley as far west as Coatesville, where Pennsylvania Route 372 becomes the main road along the valley to its western end.  The Great Valley is also served by Amtrak's Keystone Service and SEPTA's Paoli/Thorndale Line rail service for much of its length.

This Great Valley is near and parallel to, but distinct from, the Great Appalachian Valley.

The Chester Valley Trail runs through the Great Valley, from Exton in Chester County to King of Prussia in Montgomery County.

References

External links

Landforms of Chester County, Pennsylvania
Landforms of Lancaster County, Pennsylvania
Landforms of Montgomery County, Pennsylvania
Valleys of Pennsylvania